The Turkish Medicines and Medical Devices Agency (TMMDA) is a regulatory agency of the Government of Turkey that acts as the highest sanitary authority in terms of medical safety on medicines, health products, cosmetics and personal care products.

It is responsible for the enforcement of the Turkish Cosmetic regulations, which came into effect in 2005. The current Medical Device Regulation came into force on June 7, 2011. A new draft regulation aligned with the new European regulation was published in 2018.

In 2013 the Agency proposed to permit some pharmacies to import medicine independently, bypassing the Turkish Pharmacists Association although the Association successfully contested this decision.  Under Law No. 7151 on Amendment of Certain Laws and Decree Laws related to Healthcare, published in December 2018 the Social Security Institution and state institutions and organisations approved by the Ministry of Health can import medicine. It announced principles for the approval of secondary packaging and storage facilities for pharmaceuticals in January 2019.

See also
 Health care in Turkey
 Ministry of Health
 Pharmacoepidemiology

References

External links 
 

Medical and health organizations based in Turkey
Medical and health regulators
National agencies for drug regulation